Alpha Black Zero: Intrepid Protocol is a 2004 team-based tactical shooter video game for Microsoft Windows developed by Khaeon and published by Playlogic Entertainment.

Gameplay 

The player is tasked with various missions in a third-person shooter, where the player takes control of one of five special ops team members with different specializations.

Reception 

The game holds a "mixed or average" review score of 51 based on 18 critic reviews on the review aggregate Metacritic.

Reviews 

 Computer Gaming World #237
 PC Gamer (UK) #140
 PC Gamer (US) #129
 Play UK Nov 2004
 GameZone
 GameSpy
 IGN
 GameSpot

References 

2004 video games
Multiplayer and single-player video games
Playlogic Entertainment games
Tactical shooter video games
Third-person shooters
Video games developed in the Netherlands
Windows games
Windows-only games